Lake Usvyaty  is a lake in the Usvyatsky volost of the Ussvyaty Rayon of the Pskov Oblast. It has a water surface of 6.99 km² (699.0 ha) and a total surface, including islands of 7.03 km² (703.0 ha). The maximum depth is 3.6 m, the average depth is 1.4 m.

On the shore of the lake there is the settlement  Usvyaty and the villages of Bondarvo, Dvoreets, Molitvino.

The Ussycha River crosses the lake, flowing from north to south-west. The river is part of the Daugava (Western Dvina) river basin .

Type of lake is bream-roach with a glue and pike perch. Mass species of fish: bream, pike perch, pike, roach, perch, gusher, rudd, ruff, glue, sink, burbot, crucian, tench, ide, loach, pinworm.

For the lake is characteristic: in the littoral - silt, peat, sand, silted sand, in the center - silt, local frosts, in the coastal zone - meadows, swamps, wetlands

Notes

Literature 
 зеро Усвяты, Усвятский район, Псковская обл.

Usvyaty
LUsvyaty